The United States competed at the 1976 Winter Paralympics in Örnsköldsvik, Sweden. One competitor, Bill Hovanic, competed in four events in two sports. He did not win a medal.

Alpine skiing 

Bill Hovanic competed in the following events:

 Men's Alpine Combination II (finished in 5th place)
 Men's Giant Slalom II (finished in 6th place)
 Men's Slalom II (finished in 8th place)

Cross-country 

Bill Hovanic competed in the following event:

 Men's Short Distance 5 km II (finished in 13th place)

See also 
 United States at the Paralympics
 United States at the 1976 Winter Olympics

References 

1976
1976 in American sports
Nations at the 1976 Winter Paralympics